Jonathan "Jon" Solly (born 28 June 1963) is a male English former long-distance runner.

Athletics career
Solly won the gold medal for England in the 10,000 metres at the 1986 Commonwealth Games in Edinburgh, Scotland. He achieved his personal best time of 27:51.76 minutes at Crystal Palace on 20 June 1986. 1986 proved to be his peak as a "litany of injuries that could probably fill a medical text book" prevented Solly from reproducing his best form in the years ahead.

Personal life
Solly was educated at St Bartholomew's School in Newbury and Durham University, where he graduated with a degree in Politics and Economics in 1985. He still holds the university record in the 5,000 metres. He was a member of Hatfield College.

Solly is now a cabinet maker based at a workshop in Thame, Oxfordshire.

References

External links 
 
 The Power of 10 Athlete Profile

1963 births
Living people
Place of birth missing (living people)
English male long-distance runners
Commonwealth Games gold medallists for England
Commonwealth Games medallists in athletics
Athletes (track and field) at the 1986 Commonwealth Games
Alumni of Hatfield College, Durham
People educated at St. Bartholomew's School
British cabinetmakers
Medallists at the 1986 Commonwealth Games